CHMR-FM is a campus radio station broadcasting on the campus of Memorial University of Newfoundland in St. John's, Newfoundland and Labrador, Canada at 93.5 MHz, Rogers Cable channel 942 and Aliant TV channel 825.

The Memorial University of Newfoundland Radio Society received approval by the CRTC in 1986 to operate on 93.5 MHz. The 93.5 frequency launched in January 1987.

The station is operated by the university's undergraduate students' union, MUNSU. A media fee paid by all undergraduate students at Memorial's St. John's campus is the primary funding for CHMR. Along with The Muse, CHMR receives two dollars from every student each semester.

CHMR previously aired on cable radio at 103.7 MHz in the St. John's area. It moved to digital cable in late 2006, when Rogers discontinued all traditional cable FM service.

Footnotes

External links
 93.5 CHMR
 

Hmr
Hmr
Memorial University of Newfoundland